Saint-Jean-Pied-de-Port or Donibane Garazi is a railway station in Saint-Jean-Pied-de-Port, Nouvelle-Aquitaine, France. The station was opened in 1898 and is located at the end of the Bayonne - Saint-Jean-Pied-de-Port railway line. The station is served by TER (local) services operated by the SNCF.

Train services
The following services currently call at Saint-Jean-Pied-de-Port:
local service (TER Nouvelle-Aquitaine) Bayonne - Saint-Jean-Pied-de-Port

References

Railway stations in France opened in 1898
Railway stations in Pyrénées-Atlantiques